Ləcət or Ledzhet may refer to:
Ləcət, Khachmaz, Azerbaijan
Ləcət, Qusar, Azerbaijan